The 1946–47 Liga Bet season was the second tier season of league football in the British Mandate for Palestine. The league covered wider areas as North and South (previously played in smaller regional divisions). This was also the last completed season under the British Mandate for Palestine.

Maccabi Haifa (champions of the North Division) and Hapoel HaTzafon Tel Aviv (champions of the South Division) promoted to the top tier. However, due to outbreak of the 1947–1949 Palestine war, which caused the abandon of the 1947–48 season, they had to wait until the 1949–50 Israeli League season.

Following the Israeli Declaration of Independence, second tier football in Israel rearranged, and most of the participating clubs in the 1946–47 Liga Bet season continued to play in the new Liga Meuhedet (Special League), which became a temporary second division of Israeli football in the 1949–50 season.

North Division

South Division

Beitar Jerusalem, Beitar Petah Tikva, Bnei Yehuda Tel Aviv, Degel Zion Tel Aviv, Hapoel Giv'atayim and Hapoel Jerusalem were all included in the South division before the start of the season. Beitar Jerusalem and Degel Zion Tel Aviv withdrew shortly after the season started.

References
Previous seasons The Israel Football Association 

Liga Bet seasons
Palestine
2